Edward Joseph Kawal (October 13, 1909 – September 25, 1960) was an American football player.  He played professionally as a Center in the National Football League (NFL) for the Chicago Bears and the Washington Redskins.  He attended the University of Illinois and Pennsylvania Military College.

References

External links

1909 births
1960 deaths
American football centers
Illinois Fighting Illini football players
Chicago Bears players
Washington Redskins players
Widener Pride football players
People from Cicero, Illinois
Players of American football from Chicago